Jakob Thordsen (born 1999) is a German sprint canoeist.

He participated at the 2018 ICF Canoe Sprint World Championships.

References

1999 births
German male canoeists
Living people
ICF Canoe Sprint World Championships medalists in kayak
Sportspeople from Hamburg